Vilho Ferdinand Valdemar Väyrynen (12 March 1912 – 23 March 2000) was a Finnish lawyer and politician. He was Minister of Justice from 3 March to 2 May 1956 and Minister of the Interior from 3 March 1956 to 27 May 1957. He was born in Kemijärvi, and served as a Member of the Parliament of Finland from 1948 to 1962, representing the Social Democratic Party of Finland (SDP).

References

1912 births
2000 deaths
People from Kemijärvi
People from Oulu Province (Grand Duchy of Finland)
Social Democratic Party of Finland politicians
Government ministers of Finland
Members of the Parliament of Finland (1948–51)
Members of the Parliament of Finland (1951–54)
Members of the Parliament of Finland (1954–58)
Members of the Parliament of Finland (1958–62)
University of Helsinki alumni
Finnish military personnel of World War II